Tetzlaff Peak is a  mountain summit located in Tooele County, Utah, United States.

Description
Tetzlaff Peak is situated in the Silver Island Mountains which are a subset of the Great Basin Ranges, and it is set on land managed by the Bureau of Land Management. The community of Wendover, Utah, is 10 miles to the southwest and the Bonneville Speedway is five miles to the southeast. This landform's toponym was officially adopted in 1960 by the U.S. Board on Geographic Names to honor American racecar driver Teddy Tetzlaff (1883–1929). On August 12, 1914, Tetzlaff set a land speed record by driving the Blitzen Benz  at the Bonneville Salt Flats (then known as Salduro, Utah).

Climate
Tetzlaff Peak is set in the Great Salt Lake Desert which has hot summers and cold winters. The desert is an example of a cold desert climate as the desert's elevation makes temperatures cooler than lower elevation deserts. Due to the high elevation and aridity, temperatures drop sharply after sunset. Summer nights are comfortably cool. Winter highs are generally above freezing, and winter nights are bitterly cold, with temperatures often dropping well below freezing.

Gallery

See also
 
 Jenkins Peak
 List of mountain peaks of Utah

References

External links
Tetzlaff Peak: weather forecast
Pictures of Teddy Tetzlaff by James Walter Collinge

Mountains of Utah
Mountains of Tooele County, Utah
North American 1000 m summits
Great Salt Lake Desert
Mountains of the Great Basin